Metrodorus of Lampsacus may refer to two Greek philosophers: 
 Metrodorus of Lampsacus (the elder) (5th century BC) - philosopher from the school of Anaxagoras
 Metrodorus of Lampsacus (the younger) (331–278 BC) - Epicurean philosopher

See also
 Metrodorus (disambiguation)